The Islamic Society of Engineers (ISE) is a principlist political organization of engineers in Iran. Formerly one of the parties aligned with the Combatant Clergy Association, it is close to the Islamic Coalition Party, whose decisions they mostly follow. It is questionable whether it is an independent and strong party.

The Society was formed at the end of the Iran–Iraq War (1988) with the objective of elevating the Islamic, political, scientific and technical knowledge of the Muslim people of Iran, defending major freedoms such as freedom of expression and gatherings, as well as continued campaign against foreign cultural agents whether Eastern or Western materialism.

Members 
Mahmoud Ahmadinejad, the sixth President of Iran, was an active member since its establishment but turned against the party after presidency.
Mohammad Reza Bahonar, current Secretary-General and former Deputy Speaker of the Parliament of Iran
Manouchehr Mottaki, former Minister of Foreign Affairs
Mohammad Nazemi Ardakani, former Minister of Cooperatives

Party leaders

Current officeholders 

 Morteza Nabavi, Member of Expediency Discernment Council
 Morteza Saghaiyannejad, Mayor of Qom
Parliament members
 Hamidreza Fouladgar (Isfahan)
 Mohammad Mehdi Zahedi (Kerman and Ravar)
 Jabbar Kouchakinejad (Rasht)
 Mohammad Mehdi Mofatteh (Toiserkan)

References

External links
ecoi.net's profile of ISE
Hamshahri's report from the general congress of the Islamic Society of Engineers (in Persian)

1988 establishments in Iran
Political parties established in 1988
Principlist political groups in Iran
Engineering organizations